Robert or Bob Pittman may refer to:

 Robert C. Pittman (1922–1996), American pilot and entrepreneur
 Robert Pittman (media executive) (born 1953), American businessman
 Robert Pittman (born 1959), mayor of Nicoma Park, Oklahoma
 Bob Pittman, fictional sailor narrator of Newfoundland song "The Ryans and the Pittmans"

See also
 Robert Carter Pitman (1825–1891), Superior Court judge in Massachusetts and legislator in the Massachusetts General Court
 Robert L. Pitman (born 1962), United States District Judge of the United States District Court for the Western District of Texas
 Pittman (disambiguation)